Vladimír Stibořík (28 July 1927 – 12 December 2014) was a Czech sports shooter. He competed at the 1960 Summer Olympics and the 1964 Summer Olympics.

References

External links
 

1927 births
2014 deaths
Czech male sport shooters
Olympic shooters of Czechoslovakia
Shooters at the 1960 Summer Olympics
Shooters at the 1964 Summer Olympics
People from Bruntál District
Sportspeople from the Moravian-Silesian Region